Tokyo Rose was a catchphrase for English-speaking female broadcasters of Japanese propaganda during World War II.

Tokyo Rose may also refer to:

"Tokyo Rose", a song by Canadian group Idle Eyes
Tokyo Rose (album), an album by Van Dyke Parks 
Tokyo Rose (band), a rock band from New Jersey
"Tokyo Rose" (Akina Nakamori song) (1995)
Tokyo Rose, name for Garbage train car used by the Toronto Transit Commission and made by Nippon Sharyo (1968)
Tokyo Rose (film), 1946 film
The United States F-13 Superfortress aircraft which conducted the 1 November 1944 reconnaissance sortie over Japan
"Tokyo Rose", a song by Chapman Whitney from the album Chapman Whitney Streetwalkers